Sheryle Moon is an Australian businesswoman who is an advisor to PlaceChangers. Previous roles include: Chief Evangelist of Spinify, Chief Revenue Officer at eWAY, CEO Australian Institute of Project Management, Chief Executive Officer of the Australian Information Industry Association, Vice President of Computer Sciences Corporation, and a managing partner with Accenture.

Moon was named a Telstra Business Woman on the Year in 1999. She was named by Prime Minister John Howard as one of the 20 most influential women and a founding member of the Honoring Women Program on Australia Day in 2001. In 2006, she was inducted to the Australian National University Hall of Fame for her contributions to the ICT and business sectors.

References

Australian chief executives
Living people
Year of birth missing (living people)